Aputovo (Aput) is a rural locality (a selo) in Utyashevsky Selsoviet, Belokataysky District, Bashkortostan, Russia. The population was 274 as of 2010. There are 4 streets.

Geography 
Aputovo is located 5 km southeast of Novobelokatay (the district's administrative centre) by road. Novobelokatay is the nearest rural locality.

References 

Rural localities in Belokataysky District